Crowleymass is an EP released in 1987 by the English group Current 93, led by David Tibet. Crowleymass originally appeared on a 12” vinyl record through Maldoror and was later reissued in 1997 on CD format through Durtro, the record company owned by David Tibet. This reissue contained a bonus track titled “I Arise”.
With four songs, this record was produced by Icelandic renowned musician Hilmar Örn Hilmarsson and had the collaboration of guitar player Guðlaugur Kristinn Óttarsson; former Strawberry Switchblade backing vocalist Rose McDowall, J. Sen and Nyarlathotep's Idiot Flute Players.

With a more danceable orientation as compared with previous works (excepting the uncharacteristically heavy metal-like "I Arise"), Crowleymass is considered a cult collectible by gothic rock and industrial music followers.

12" track listing

CD track listing

External links
Official site of Current 93
Official site of Guðlaugur Kristinn Óttarsson
Page of G. K. Óttarsson at MySpace.com

1987 EPs
Current 93 albums